Forficula lucasi is a species of earwig found in Africa and has been introduced to Greece.

References 

Forficulidae
Insects described in 1885